The , also known as ,  , , or Katakana-Hiragana Prolonged Sound Mark by the Unicode Consortium, is a Japanese symbol that indicates a chōon, or a long vowel of two morae in length. Its form is a horizontal or vertical line in the center of the text with the width of one kanji or kana character. It is written horizontally in horizontal text and vertically in vertical text. The chōonpu is usually used to indicate a long vowel sound in katakana writing, rarely in hiragana writing, and never in romanized Japanese. The chōonpu is a distinct mark from the dash, and in most Japanese typefaces it can easily be distinguished. In horizontal writing it is similar in appearance to, but should not be confused with, the kanji character  ("one").

The symbol is sometimes used with hiragana, for example in the signs of ramen restaurants, which are normally written /らあめん in hiragana, and ラーメン in katakana. Usually, however, hiragana does not use the chōonpu but another vowel kana to express this sound. 

Ombiki may also be found after kanji as indication of phonetic, rather than phonemic, length of a vowel (as in "キョン君、電話ー").

The following table shows the usual hiragana equivalents used to form a long vowel, using the ha-gyō (the ha, hi, fu, he, ho sequence) as an example.

When rendering English words into katakana, the chōonpu is often used to represent a syllable-final sequence of a vowel letter + r, which in English generally represents a long vowel if the syllable is stressed and a schwa if unstressed (in non-rhotic dialects such as Received Pronunciation; in rhotic dialects (such as General American) it may additionally be an R-colored vowel).

In addition to Japanese, chōonpu are also used in Okinawan writing systems to indicate two morae. The Sakhalin dialect of Ainu also uses chōonpu in its katakana writing for long vowels.

Digital encoding
In Unicode, the chōonpu has the value , which corresponds to JIS X 0208 kuten code point 01-28, encoded in Shift JIS as 815B. It is normally rendered fullwidth and with a glyph appropriate to the writing direction. The halfwidth compatibility form has the value , which is converted to Shift JIS value B0.

Other representations
Braille:

Footnotes

See also
 Sokuon
 Tsu (kana)
 Kanji

References

External links
 

Kana
Japanese phonology
Japanese writing system terms